Witches' Stone is an historic stone in the Scottish parish of St Martins, Perth and Kinross. It marks the location where Macbeth meets with two witches in William Shakespeare's tragedy. It is first mentioned in text in 1806, when William Mackenzie, father of architect  William Macdonald Mackenzie, was the landowner.

References 

Stones
Perth and Kinross